Silke Lave Glud (born 3 March 1996) is a Danish ice hockey player and member of the Danish national ice hockey team, currently serving as captain of the Rødovre Mighty Bulls Q in the KvindeLigaen.

Playing career
She has represented Denmark at seven IIHF Women's World Championships, including at the Top Division tournament of the 2021 IIHF Women's World Championship.

Career statistics

International

References

External links 
 

Living people
1996 births
People from Hvidovre Municipality
Danish women's ice hockey forwards
Danish women's ice hockey defencemen
Luleå HF/MSSK players
Danish expatriate ice hockey people
Danish expatriate sportspeople in Sweden
Expatriate ice hockey players in Sweden
Ice hockey players at the 2022 Winter Olympics
Olympic ice hockey players of Denmark
Sportspeople from the Capital Region of Denmark